Thalapady can refer to
 Thalappady, Kasaragod
 Talapady, D.K.